The Steenkampskraal mine is a rare-earth elements (REEs) mine  north of Vanrhynsdorp in the Western Cape province of South Africa. The mine was operated by Anglo American Corporation from 1952 to 1963. In addition to the mining right area of 474 hectares, the company also owns three surrounding farms with a total area of about 7,000 hectares. Steenkampskraal has the highest grade Rare Earth deposit in the world. It has a resource of about 605,000 tons at an average grade of 14.4% Total Rare Earth Oxide (TREO) for a total of 86,900 tons contained TREO. Each ton of ore in the Steenkampskraal mine contains rare earths to the value of approximately US$3,000 at present market prices. The total quantity of neodymium in the mine is 15,600 tons at a resource grade of 2.58% Nd2O3.

References

 Steenkampskraal, "Company & PropertyMine", http://www.infomine.com/index/properties/Steenkampskraal.html
 Steenkampskraal, "Rare Earths", https://www.steenkampskraal.com/
 Great Western Minerals Group Ltd: Steenkampskraal Rare Earth Element Project, South AfricaTechnical Report and Mineral Resource Estimate 15 December2012

Mines in South Africa
Buildings and structures in the Western Cape
Economy of the Western Cape
Matzikama Local Municipality